"Cora, the Indian Maiden's Song" ("The Wild Free Wind") is a song written by Shirley Brooks for his burletta The Wigwam sometime before 1847. Alexander Lee composed the music. In the song, Cora, the Indian maiden, is praising the wind: "Oh! The wild free wind is a Spirit Kind, And it loves the Indian well." The song's chorus is:

In the 1847 London presentation of The Wigwam, Mary Keeley played Cora where she received high praise for her rendering of the song.

References

Bibliography
 Brooks, Shirley (w.); Lee, Alexander (m). "Cora, the Indian Maiden's Song" (Sheet music). New York: Firth, Pond & Co. (1851).
 The Musical World Vol. XXII (No. 7, Saturday, February 13, 1847). London: W.S Johnson (1847).

1851 songs
Opera excerpts
English-language operas